H2B could refer to:

 A Honda powertrain modification consisting of a H series engine coupled to a B series drivetrain.
 H-2B visa, a US program for temporary/seasonal, non-agricultural employment by foreign nationals.
 Heavens to Betsy, a punk rock band from Olympia, Washington, USA.
 Histone H2B, one of 5 main histone proteins involved in the structure of chromatin in eukaryotic cells.
 H-IIB, a family of Japanese rockets.
 Help to Buy, financial assistance for purchasing a home in the UK.
 H2B Windows, also known as Help to Buy Windows. A company based in the UK supplying double glazing grants to homeowners.